Willis Everett "Kid" Butler (August 9, 1887 – February 22, 1964) was an infielder in Major League Baseball. He played for the St. Louis Browns in 1907.

References

External links 

1887 births
1964 deaths
People from Franklin, Pennsylvania
Major League Baseball infielders
St. Louis Browns players
Cleveland Indians scouts
Baseball players from Pennsylvania
Akron Rubbernecks players
Nashville Vols players
Toledo Mud Hens players
Portland Beavers players
Venice Tigers players
Memphis Chickasaws players
Spokane Indians players
Victoria Bees players
Beaumont Oilers players
San Antonio Bronchos players
Los Angeles Angels (minor league) players
Sacramento Senators players
London Tecumsehs (baseball) players